Callomphala hoeksemai is a species of sea snail, a marine gastropod mollusk in the family Skeneidae.

Description
Callomphala hoeksemai belongs to the Skeneidae family, Trochoidea Superfamily, Trochida Order, Vetigastropoda Subclass, Gastropoda Class, Mollusca Phylum, and Animalia Kingdom

Distribution

References

External links

hoeksemai
Gastropods described in 2008